Universidad Latinoamericana is a private university in Mexico. It is part of Lottus Education, a Mexican Education Group. It offers Traditional programs, Executive Programs and Online programs for bachelor's degree, master's degree and specializations.

History
The Universidad Latinoamericana was founded in 1975, with campus in Mexico City and the States of Morelos, Guanajuato & Querétaro. In 2019, it was acquired by Lottus Education.

Campuses
The University has four traditional campuses: Valle, Florida, Norte and Cuernavaca. and 11 Executive Campus: Aragón, Coacalco, Coapa, El Rosario, Guaymas, León, Metepec, Querétaro, Reforma, Suroriente, Valle Dorado.

Academic profile
Traditional campuses offers high school program, 24 bachelor's degree programs, 7 master's degrees and 6 specializations.
Executive campuses offers 7 bachelor's degrees, 1 master's degree.

External links
http://www.ula.edu.mx/home
http://www.sic.gob.mx/ficha.php?table=universidad&table_id=320

Universities and colleges in Mexico